Spagna is an underground station on Line A of the Rome Metro, in the rione Campo Marzio, which was inaugurated in 1980.

The station is named after the nearby Piazza di Spagna: its main exit is on Vicolo del Bottino, a short stretch of road that leads to the square. Another exit, connected by a series of moving walkways, is located near Porta Pinciana and the homonymous entrance to Villa Borghese.

History 
The Spagna station was built as part of the first section (from Anagnina to Ottaviano) of the Line A of the Rome Metro, which came into service in 1980.

The project of an interchange with the future Line D was abandoned in the autumn of 2012.

On 23 March 2019, after that Barberini was impounded for a problem with the escalators, Spagna was also closed. The closure lasted about a month and a half: in fact, the station reopened to the public at 6 pm on 7 May 2019.

Services
This station has:
 Parking at Villa Borghese
 Escalators
 Elevators
 Ticket office
 Ticket machine

Interchanges 
  ATAC bus stop

Located nearby 
Piazza di Spagna/Spanish Steps
Via del Babuino
Via dei Condotti
Spanish Embassy to the Holy See
De La Ville Hotel Intercontinental
Trinità dei Monti
Sallustiano Obelisk
 Colonna dell'Immacolata
Palazzo di Propaganda Fide
Keats–Shelley Memorial House
Villa Medici
Villa Borghese
Pincio
Piazza Colonna
Palazzo Montecitorio
Palazzo Chigi
Column of Marcus Aurelius
Galleria Alberto Sordi
Via del Corso
Santa Maria in Via
Palazzo Borghese
Ara Pacis
Mausoleum of Augustus

References

Bibliography

External links 

Spagna station on the Rome public transport site (in Italian)

Rome Metro Line A stations
Railway stations opened in 1980
1980 establishments in Italy
Rome R. IV Campo Marzio
Railway stations in Italy opened in the 20th century